Richard José Rojas Guzmán (born 27 February 1975 in Cochabamba) is a Bolivian football manager and former player who played as a midfielder.

Rojas' former clubs are Chaco Petrolero, The Strongest, Club Aurora, including a second stint with The Strongest. He played 21 games for the Bolivia national team between 1999 and 2004.

References

External links
 
 

1975 births
Living people
Bolivian footballers
Bolivia international footballers
2001 Copa América players
2004 Copa América players
Chaco Petrolero players
The Strongest players
Club San José players
Club Aurora players
La Paz F.C. players
C.D. Jorge Wilstermann players
Sportspeople from Cochabamba
Association football midfielders
Bolivian football managers
C.D. Real Tomayapo managers